The Netherlands Football League Championship 1926–1927 was contested by 50 teams participating in five divisions. The national champion would be determined by a play-off featuring the winners of the eastern, northern, southern and two western football divisions of the Netherlands. Heracles won this year's championship by beating NAC, AFC Ajax, Feijenoord and Velocitas 1897.

New entrants
Eerste Klasse East:
Promoted from 2nd Division: Robur et Velocitas
Eerste Klasse North:
Promoted from 2nd Division: GVAV
Eerste Klasse South:
Promoted from 2nd Division: PSV Eindhoven
Eerste Klasse West-I:
Moving in from West-II: AFC Ajax and SBV Excelsior
Promoted from 2nd Division: VUC
Eerste Klasse West-II:
Moving in from West-I: Koninklijke HFC and VOC
Promoted from 2nd Division: FC Hilversum

Divisions

Eerste Klasse East

Eerste Klasse North

Eerste Klasse South

Eerste Klasse West-I

Eerste Klasse West-II

Championship play-off

References
RSSSF Netherlands Football League Championships 1898-1954
RSSSF Eerste Klasse Oost
RSSSF Eerste Klasse Noord
RSSSF Eerste Klasse Zuid
RSSSF Eerste Klasse West

Netherlands Football League Championship seasons
1926–27 in Dutch football
Netherlands